Silver fox or Silver Fox may refer to:

Animals
 Silver fox (animal), a melanistic form of the red fox

Arts and entertainment
 Silver Fox (character), in Marvel Comics 
 "Silver Fox", a song by RJD2 from the 2002 album Deadringer

Military
 Operation Silver Fox, a German-Finnish World War II military campaign
 BAE Systems Silver Fox, an unmanned aerial vehicle

People with the nickname
 Basdeo Panday (born 1933), former actor and Prime Minister of Trinidad and Tobago
 Anderson Cooper (born 1967), CNN News anchor
 Barbara Bush (1925-2018), former first lady of the United States
 Peter Costa (poker player) (born 1956), British poker player
 Mel Judah (born 1947), Australian poker player
 Ed Kelly (born 1948), Irish-American former soccer player
 Jim Northrup (baseball) (1939-2011), American Major League Baseball player 
 Jesse Petty (1894-1971), American Major League Baseball pitcher
 Charlie Rich (1932-1995), American singer
 Ray Knight (born 1952), American baseball player, manager and broadcaster
 David Pearson (racing driver) (1934-2018), NASCAR driver
 Duke Snider (1926-2011), American baseball player
 Robert L. Stephens (1921-1984), United States Air Force test pilot
 David Taylor (snooker player) (born 1943), English snooker player
 Eduard Shevardnadze (1928-2014), Soviet politician and former president of Georgia

Other uses
 Silver Fox Island, Newfoundland, Canada
 Regina Silver Foxes, a former Canadian Junior "A" ice hockey team
 Silver Foxes, a former name of the Kent State Golden Flashes football team
 Silver Fox, an LNER Class A4 steam locomotive 
 Silver Fox, in Miwok mythology

Lists of people by nickname